Jenatsch is a 1987 French-Swiss drama film directed by Daniel Schmid. It was screened in the Un Certain Regard section at the 1987 Cannes Film Festival.

Cast
 Michel Voïta - Christophe Sprecher
 Christine Boisson - Nina
 Vittorio Mezzogiorno - Jörg Jenatsch
 Jean Bouise - Dr. Tobler
 Laura Betti - Mademoiselle von Planta
 Carole Bouquet - Lucrezia von Planta
 Raúl Gimenez - Le chauffeur de taxi
 Roland Bertin - Le prêtre
 Jean-Paul Muel - Le Monsieur du bain
 Lucrezia Giovannini - La vieille servante
 Peter Bonke - Peter Hertig
 Ursina Hartmann - Esther Hertig
 Teco Celio - L'historien Cavelti
 Yvonne Kupper - La serveuse de Thusis
 Béatrice Stoll - La patronne de la taverne

References

External links

Jenatsch at the Swiss Film Directory

1987 films
French drama films
Swiss drama films
1980s French-language films
1987 drama films
Films directed by Daniel Schmid
French-language Swiss films
1980s French films